Suzan Gail LeVine (born November 17, 1969) is an American businesswoman and diplomat who served as the United States Ambassador to Switzerland and Liechtenstein from 2014 to 2017.

Early life and education 
LeVine was born near Philadelphia and grew up in Ventnor City, New Jersey. In 1993, she earned a Bachelor of Science in mechanical engineering with aerospace applications and a Bachelor of Arts in English from Brown University. She also received an honorary degree from EPFL, the Swiss Federal Institute of Technology in Lausanne, in October 2017.

Career

Information technology 
Her career started in technology with college summer internships at NASA's Jet Propulsion Laboratory and Carnegie Mellon's Data Storage System's Center. She then started her first full-time job working on operating systems at Microsoft in 1993 where she worked on MS-DOS and then helped launch Windows 95. She ran communications for the Expedia IPO and stayed with Expedia until 2005, becoming Vice President of Sales & Marketing in the Luxury Travel Division. In 2009, she went back to Microsoft and focused on education until 2012.

Non-profit 
In 2006, she and Rabbi Rachel Nussbaum co-founded the Kavana Cooperative. The same year, she co-founded the advisory board for the Institute for Learning and Brain Sciences (I-LABS) at the University of Washington with Bill Henningsgaard.

Democratic Fundraiser 
Suzan "Suzi" LeVine was Democratic Party Fundraiser for the Obama-Biden 2008 and 2012 campaigns

Ambassador to Switzerland and Liechtenstein 
LeVine was sworn in as the United States Ambassador to Switzerland and Liechtenstein on May 30, 2014 and took up her position in Bern on June 2, 2014. LeVine took her oath of office while placing a hand on a Kindle containing the U.S. Constitution and, thereby, became the first U.S. official to be sworn in on an e-reader. She resigned her post in Bern on January 20, 2017. On July 9, 2018, she joined Governor Jay Inslee's cabinet as the new Commissioner of the Employment Security Department.

During her tenure, LeVine worked to expand foreign direct investment (FDI) into the U.S., counter violent extremism, enable American citizens in Switzerland to regain access to banking services, and advance a global diversity dialogue. She also advocated for female participation in entrepreneurship and technical fields, supporting women in both corporations and universities.

Apprenticeship 
While in Switzerland, she was instrumental in the signing of a Joint Declaration of Intent between Switzerland and the United States to collaborate on apprenticeship and partnered with 30 companies to bring and/or expand their Swiss style apprenticeship model into the United States. She also secured billions of dollars in investment and hundreds of jobs into the United States – with $3B alone announced at a special White House round table she catalyzed with Swiss business and government leaders.

During their time in Switzerland, Ambassador LeVine and her husband, Eric LeVine, hosted a number of visitors from the United States to view the Swiss system. Most notable was a delegation from Colorado led by Governor John Hickenlooper.

Since returning from Switzerland, LeVine and her husband have been speaking across the U.S. and around the globe at events, round-tables, and with individuals in government, academia, business, and philanthropy about what can be learned, derived, and applied from the Swiss dual education system. She and her husband are convinced that there are many pathways to success, and that an "Apprenticeship Renaissance," as she calls it, is a key to the long-term economic growth in the United States and a key to more people than ever achieving their American Dream.

She now serves on the CareerWise Colorado board, the Markle Foundation's Rework America Task Force, ETH's CEMETS International Advisory Board, and the Seattle Region Partnership. She also served on Governor Inslee's Career Connect Taskforce which completed its work and made its recommendations Feb 20, 2018.

ESD Commissioner 
As the commissioner for the Washington State Employment and Security Department, LeVine led an agency that is responsible for the state's unemployment insurance system, the new paid family and medical leave program, the funding administration for the WorkSource system, the labor market information, aspects of the H-2A and H-2B foreign guest worker programs, and the Washington State Service Corps program. During the COVID-19 pandemic in 2020, the ESD was the target of an international fraud scheme. 87,000 claims worth $650,000,000 was sent overseas to fraudulent accounts.

She is a member of the Council of American Ambassadors.

Assistant Secretary of the Employment and Training Administration (ETA) 
In 2021, LeVine served as the acting Assistant Secretary of the Employment and Training Administration (ETA) under the Biden Administration. She resigned after seven months citing the job's impact on her family.

Civic engagement 
LeVine has volunteered as a community organizer and resource raiser for several Democratic campaigns, most notably, for Obama for America. She currently serves as a Deputy National Finance Chair for the DNC and as an Advisory Council Member for the NDRC (National Democratic Redistricting Council).

Personal life 
She and her husband, Eric LeVine, CEO of CellarTracker, have two children, Sidney and Talia LeVine.

References 

1969 births
Ambassadors of the United States to Liechtenstein
Ambassadors of the United States to Switzerland
Place of birth missing (living people)
American women ambassadors
Brown University School of Engineering alumni
Living people
21st-century American women